Rhythm X, Inc. is a non-profit music education organization that operates a competitive indoor percussion ensemble and wind ensemble, as well as an online school for marching music called The X Academy. The company was founded in 2002 by Craig Dunn as the Rhythm X Performance Ensemble.  The ensembles compete in both the Winter Guard International (WGI) and Mid-East Performance Association (MEPA) circuits in the World Class, which is the classification given to the ensembles that execute musical and visual programs of the highest difficulty. In 2013, Rhythm X announced the launch of The X Academy, an online and in-person educational program suited for high school and college-age musicians interested in competitive percussion and wind ensembles. Later that year the organization announced the addition of its newest ensemble that would compete in the new WGI Winds Division in 2015.

Rhythm X was the 2008, 2009, and 2013 WGI World Champion in Percussion Independent World (PIW) Class and is well-known to indoor marching percussion fans and participants around the world as consistently one of the most highly skilled competitors.  The percussion ensemble has also gained a reputation for presenting some of the most innovative content at each WGI Percussion World Championship and is a crowd favorite virtually every year.

History 
Rhythm X was founded in 2001 by Craig Dunn and was initially intended to provide a competitive percussion performance experience for young musicians in Ohio.  The unit was immediately successful, as it captured the gold medal in its inaugural season in Percussion Independent Open class at the 2002 WGI World Championships.  Rhythm X has been classified as Percussion Independent World every season since then.

As Rhythm X's successes have continued, the membership has expanded beyond local Ohio students.  Several hours of transportation is typical, but members have commuted as far as twelve hours one way every weekend to participate.  Others move to Ohio for the season's duration.  In its early years, the ensemble had a mixture of high school and college students, but the current membership contains almost exclusively college students.  Most of the members also have experience in World Class Drum Corps International drum and bugle corps.

In 2007, Rhythm X became the first independent Winter Guard International percussion ensemble to conduct a tour of Europe.  The members and staff performed and offered clinics in England, France, and Belgium using their 2007 show "Behind the Velvet Rope" as a demonstration.

In 2008, Craig Dunn announced that Andrew Markworth would be overtaking the role of Ensemble Director for Rhythm X, while Dunn would continue with some duties as executive director.

In 2009, Rhythm X announced its sponsorship of a newly formed percussion ensemble in the Netherlands called European X.  Head staff members Craig Dunn, Tim Fairbanks, Andrew Markworth, and Tim Jackson periodically visit them to assist with their shows' designs and their members' educations.

In 2010, Rhythm X announced that Tim Jackson would be assuming the role of Ensemble Director for the group.

In 2012, in preparation for the coming 2013 season the Rhythm X staff was slightly restructured. Tim Fairbanks assumed the role of Ensemble Director and a new position was added. Mike Scott joined the administrative team as Operations Director. In 2013 Rhythm X also launched a new website, e-commerce store, and a staff blog.

WGI World Championship Results 

Rhythm X has maintained consistent competitive success at WGI World Championships and has been a finalist every year since its inception.  The unit has been awarded 3 PIW gold medals, 6 PIW silver medals, 2 PIW bronze medals, and 1 PIO gold medal.

Gold background indicates WGI Championship; Silver background indicates WGI silver medal, Bronze background indicates WGI Bronze medal pale blue background indicates WGI Class Finalist; pale green background indicates WGI semifinalist

Score taken from final WGI show before the remainder of the season was cancelled due to the COVID-19 Pandemic.
Rhythm X did not field an ensemble in 2021.

WGI World Winds Division
Rhythm X has maintained consistent competitive success at WGI World Championships and has been a finalist every year since its inception. The unit has been awarded 4 WIW gold medals, and 1 WIW silver medal.

Gold background indicates WGI Championship; Silver background indicates WGI silver medal, Bronze background indicates WGI Bronze medal pale blue background indicates WGI Class Finalist

Score taken from final WGI show before the remainder of the season was cancelled due to the COVID-19 Pandemic.
Rhythm X Winds did not field an ensemble in 2021 or 2022.

Achievements 
The third highest-scoring WGI PIW performance at World Championships is held by Rhythm X's 2013 show "The Man in the Arena" with a score of 98.263.
Rhythm X is one of only 6 ensembles to ever win the PIW gold medal at WGI World Championships.
During the 2007 season, Rhythm X became the first independent WGI indoor percussion ensemble to ever tour Europe.
Rhythm X and the Blue Knights Percussion Ensemble are tied for the second-most consecutive WGI PIW gold medals.

References

External links 
 Official Website

Percussion ensembles
Musical groups from Columbus, Ohio
Musical groups established in 2001